Šmihel is a village south of Pivka in the Inner Carniola region of Slovenia.

Name
The name of the settlement was changed from Šmihel na Krasu (literally, 'Saint Michael on the Karst') to Dolane in 1952. The name was changed on the basis of the 1948 Law on Names of Settlements and Designations of Squares, Streets, and Buildings as part of efforts by Slovenia's postwar communist government to remove religious elements from toponyms. The name Šmihel was restored in 1990.

Church
The parish church, from which the settlement gets its name, is dedicated to Saint Michael and belongs to the Koper Diocese.

References

External links

Šmihel on Geopedia

Populated places in the Municipality of Pivka